Ethel Barrett (December 28, 1913 – May 10, 1998) was a prolific Christian writer, speaker, and storyteller, whose popularity peaked between the early 1950s and the mid-1980s.  She sold millions of copies of over 40 different books for publishers like Zondervan, Gospel Light and Regal Books.  The latter printed and sold more than 4 million copies of her work.  She also recorded over 30 audio recordings distributed on records and tapes.

Biography

Ethel started her storytelling career as a Sunday School teacher in Schenectady, New York in the early 1940s.  She was asked to teach the Boys Brigade class, made up of the most unruly boys in the area.  She had so much trouble keeping their attention that she began telling Bible stories using character voices and full dialog to capture their attention.  That Sunday School class became a great success and her local fame and storytelling talent landed her some weekend radio jobs where she would tell Bible stories on local Christian radio stations.

Her most recognized works included the retelling of John Bunyan's Holy War, The Chronicles of Mansoul, Storytelling – It's Easy which had more than 21 different printings, Don't Look Now, which sold over 80,000 copies, The Secret Sign, which sold over 165,000 copies, and Will the Real Phony Please Stand Up sold over 150,000 copies, and There I Stood in All My Spendor sold over 640,000 copies.

She was nominated for a Grammy Award in 1978 in the "Best Record for Children" category for her record album "Ethel Barrett Tells Favorite Bible Stories" and was posthumously awarded the Great Christian Storyteller Award for the last 100 years at the Christian Storytelling Convention in 2007.

Select bibliography
Barrett : A Street Cop Who Cared
Don't Look Now, But Your Personality is Showing
Ethel Barrett Tells Favorite Bible Stories
Ethel Barrett Tells Bible Stories to Children Volume 1
Ethel Barrett Tells Bible Stories to Children Volume 2
Fanny Crosby (includes hymns and music)
God and a Boy Named Joe
God, Have You Got It all Together?
If I had a Wish
It Didn't Just Happen, and Other Talk-About Bible Stories
It Only Hurts When I Laugh: A Letter from Peter
John Welch: The Man Who Couldn't be Stopped
Our Family's First Bible Storybook
Peace and Quiet and Other Hazards
The People Who Couldn't be Stopped
Rules, Who Needs Them?
The Secret Sign
Steve Paxon: Can't Lose for Winning
Storytelling, It's Easy
"The Strangest Thing Happened..."
There I Stood in All My Splendor
 The War for Mansoul:  A John Bunyan Classic co-authored with John Bunyan
This book has been revised and renamed a few times:
Ethel Barrett's Holy War: with Apologies to John Bunyan (1969)
The Great Conflict: The Story of Satan's Struggle for Possession of Your Soul (1970)
Chronicles of Mansoul: A John Bunyan Classic (1980)
The War for Mansoul:  A John Bunyan Classic (1998)
What Makes a Teenager Say, "Sometimes I Feel Like a Blob"
Which Way to Nineveh
Will the Real Phony Please Stand Up?

Great Heroes of the Bible series
Abraham: God's Faithful Pilgrim
The Disappearing Prophets and Other Stories About Elijah and Elisha
Doomed or Delivered and Other Stories about Daniel
The Giant Slayer: David
Joseph
Journey into the Unknown and Other Stories About Joshua
The Man Struck Down by Light and Other Stories About Paul
Master of Mystery and Dreams: Daniel
Men of Mystery and Miracles: Elijah and Elisha
Moses, Mission Impossible
Paul: One Man's Extraordinary Adventures
Peter, the Story of a Deserter Who Became a Forceful Leader
Ruth

Stories to Grow On series
A series of children's books

First series illustrated by Jim Padgett
Many of these were released as audiobooks and 2-in-1 volumes
Blister Lamb: Learning to Obey
Buzz Bee: Learning Respect for Authority
Cracker: The Horse Who Lost his Temper
Gregory the Grub: Learning about Eternal Life
Ice, Water, and Snow
Muffy and the Mystery of the Stolen Eggs: Learning Honesty and Truthfulness
Quacky and Wacky: Learning You are Special
Sylvester, the Three-Spined Stickleback: Learning the Importance of Being Unselfish

Second series illustrated by David Gaddy
Jasper the Jealous Dog Learns the Value of Friendship
Puff the Uppity Ant Learns the Value of Helping and Cooperation
Smarty the Adventurous Fly Learns Not to Wander too Far From Home
Sunny the Greedy Goat Learns the Value of Self-Control

1913 births
1998 deaths
American Christian writers
American storytellers
Women storytellers